Clemens Julius Mangner, often C. J. Mangner in abbreviated form, (24 September 1885 – 19 December 1961) was a German architect who worked in his home town of Bonn and in what is now Wuppertal.

Life 
He studied, among others, with Wilhelm Kreis in Düsseldorf. His architectural firm last ran a residential and office building in Barmen, built for himself according to his own plans. (An der Bergbahn 14). From there he also planned, among other things, residential buildings for Bonn's new citizens from the Ruhr area. From 1920 onwards, he can be traced for a few years with an office in Bonn (Münsterplatz 19). He was a member of the Bund Deutscher Architekten, within which he was appointed chairman and later honorary chairman of the Wuppertal district group and the Düsseldorf district group, as well as for a time of the Deutscher Werkbund.

Awards 
 24 September 1955: Order of Merit of the Federal Republic of Germany 1. Class.
 1957: Cornelius-Gurlitt-Gedenkmünze der .

Work

Buildings

Miscellaneous 
 After 1910: Wuppertal, overall development plan for the north-west slope of the Hardt.
 1920: Wuppertal, Development plan for the Lüntenbeck housing estate in the same-named residential quarter (commissioned by the Gartenheim-Bund).

References

Further reading 
 Jörg Moll: „Moderate Moderne“ contra „Bauhaus“. Clemens Julius Mangner, ein Wuppertaler Architekt. In  (ed.): Die Barmer Südstadt, Müller + Busmann, Wuppertal 1994, .

20th-century German architects
Officers Crosses of the Order of Merit of the Federal Republic of Germany
1885 births
1961 deaths
People from Bonn